The 2022 Nevada Wolf Pack football team represented the University of Nevada, Reno as a member of the Mountain West Conference during the 2022 NCAA Division I FBS football season. They will be led by head coach Ken Wilson, who will be coaching his first season with the team. The Wolf Pack will play their home games at Mackay Stadium in Reno, Nevada.

Schedule
Nevada and the Mountain West Conference announced the 2022 football schedule on February 16, 2022.

Game summaries

at New Mexico State

Texas State

No. 8 (FCS) Incarnate Word

at Iowa

at Air Force

Colorado State

at Hawaii

San Diego State

at San Jose State

Boise State

Fresno State

at UNLV

References

Nevada
Nevada Wolf Pack football seasons
Nevada Wolf Pack football